The Russo-Turkish War of 1787–1792 involved an unsuccessful attempt by the Ottoman Empire to regain lands lost to the Russian Empire in the course of the previous Russo-Turkish War (1768–1774). It took place concomitantly with the Austro-Turkish War (1788–1791), Russo-Swedish War (1788–1790) and Theatre War.

During the Russian-Turkish War of 1787–1792, on 25 September 1789, a detachment of the Imperial Russian Army under Alexander Suvorov and Ivan Gudovich, took Khadjibey and Yeni Dünya for the Russian Empire. In 1794, Odesa was founded by a decree of the Russian empress Catherine the Great. 

Russia formally gained possession of the Sanjak of Özi (Ochakiv Oblast) in 1792 and it became a part of Yekaterinoslav Viceroyalty. The Russian Empire took full control of Crimea, as well as land between the Southern Bug and the Dnieste.

Background
In May and June 1787, Catherine II of Russia made a triumphal procession through New Russia and the annexed Crimea in company with her ally, Holy Roman Emperor Joseph II. These events, the rumors about Catherine's Greek Plan, and the friction caused by the mutual complaints of infringements of the Treaty of Küçük Kaynarca, which had ended the previous war, stirred up public opinion in Constantinople, while the British and French ambassadors lent their unconditional support to the Ottoman war party.

War

In 1787, the Ottomans demanded that the Russians evacuate the Crimea and give up their holdings near the Black Sea, which Russia saw as a casus belli. Russia declared war on 19 August 1787, and the Ottomans imprisoned the Russian ambassador, Yakov Bulgakov. Ottoman preparations were inadequate and the moment was ill-chosen, as Russia and Austria were now in alliance. The Ottomans mustered forces throughout their domain, and Süleyman Bey from Anatolia went himself to the front at the head of 4000 soldiers.

The Ottoman Empire opened their offensive with an attack on two fortresses near Kinburn, in southern Ukraine. Russian General Alexander Suvorov held off these two Ottoman sea-borne attacks in September and October 1787, thus securing the Crimea. In Moldavia, Russian troops captured the Ottoman cities of Chocim and Jassy. Ochakov, at the mouth of the Dnieper, fell on 6 December 1788 after a six-month siege by Prince Grigori Potemkin and Suvorov. All civilians in the captured cities were massacred by order of Potemkin.

Although suffering a series of defeats against the Russians, the Ottoman Empire found some success against the Austrians, led by Emperor Joseph II, in Serbia and Transylvania.

By 1789, the Ottoman Empire was being pressed back in Moldavia by Russian and Austrian forces. To make matters worse, on 1 August the Russians under Suvorov attained a victory against the Ottomans led by Osman Pasha at Focsani, followed by a Russian victory at Rymnik (or Rimnik) on 22 September, and drove them away from near the Râmnicul Sărat river. Suvorov was given the title Count Rymniksky following the battle. The Ottomans suffered more losses when the Austrians, under General Gideon E. von Laudon repelled an Ottoman invasion of Croatia, while an Austrian counterattack took Belgrade.

A Greek revolt, which further drained the Ottoman war effort, brought about a truce between the Ottoman Empire and Austria. Meanwhile, the Russians continued their advance when Suvorov captured the reportedly "impenetrable" Ottoman fortress of Ismail at the entrance of the Danube, in December 1790. A final Ottoman defeat at Machin (9 July 1791), coupled with Russian concerns about Prussia entering the war, led to a truce agreed upon on 31 July 1791. After the capture of the fortress, Suvorov marched upon Constantinople (present-day Istanbul), where the Russians hoped they could establish a Christian empire. However, as Prof. Timothy C. Dowling states, the slaughters that were committed in the ensuing period somewhat defiled Suvorov's reputation in many eyes, and there were allegations at the time that he was drunk at the siege of Ochakov. Persistent rumors about his actions were spread and circulated, and in 1791 he was relocated to Finland.

Aftermath
Accordingly, the Treaty of Jassy was signed on 9 January 1792, recognizing Russia's 1783 annexation of the Crimean Khanate. Yedisan (Odessa and Ochakov) was also ceded to Russia, and the Dniester was made the Russian frontier in Europe, while the Russian Asiatic frontier—the Kuban River—remained unchanged. The Ottoman war goal to reclaim the Crimea had failed, and if not for the French Revolution, the Ottoman Empire's situation could have been much worse.

Notes

References

Sources

External links

1780s conflicts
1790s conflicts
 
Military operations involving the Crimean Khanate
18th century in Ukraine
18th-century military history of the Russian Empire
1780s in the Ottoman Empire
1780s in the Russian Empire
1790s in the Ottoman Empire
1790s in the Russian Empire
Wars involving Chechnya
Military history of Ukraine
Catherine the Great